Om Telolet Om (also known as #OmTeloletOm) is a social media meme that depicts Indonesian youths' excitement when a bus driver honks a modified horn in a rhythmic manner as they pass by. This phenomenon becomes popular after a video was uploaded to social media taken in Jepara on the island of Java. The video shows a group of youths standing at the side of a road waiting for a bus to pass by. As the bus comes near them, they will shout “Om Telolet Om”, sometimes when holding a paper with the phrase written on it.   

The word om is a term to call an older male. If translated to English, it means “uncle”, but in general, it can also mean “sir”; while telolet on the other hand represents the sound of a bus horn. Most Indonesian buses produce a rhythmatic horn or "telolet" as the name implies; while some simply produce a simple “honk”. In short, when people says: "om, telolet, om", it literally means: "Sir, honk the horn, Sir!" Specifically this shouting is directed mainly to a bus or sometimes even a truck driver. This is also equivalent to the "trucker salute" where children pump their arms as a signal to truckers to blow their airhorns, which is common in Canada, the U.S. and even Europe.

Background
As the Indonesian netizen spammed the Twitter and Instagram accounts of several DJs including DJ Snake, Marshmello, Firebeatz, Dillon Francis, Zedd, DJ Soda, and Cash Cash with the hashtag "OmTeloletOm", the phrase began to gain popularity. By the end of December 2016, it had become a trending topic internationally. The spam effort worked and international DJs started to create musical arrangements using modified bus honking, kids screaming "Om Telolet Om" and their laughter. The DJs also played these arrangements in their concerts including Life in Color, a paint and music concert in Miami which announced that their secret headliner would be "Om Tell et Om". Music videos have been created in response to the meme, the most notable one being the one performed by the Indonesian singer "iMeyMey".

References 

Social media campaigns
Indonesian words and phrases
Internet memes introduced in 2016
Internet in Indonesia
Bus transport in Indonesia